Richdale is a hamlet in east-central Alberta, Canada within Special Area No. 2. Previously an incorporated community, Richdale dissolved from village status on June 2, 1931.

Demographics 
Richdale recorded a population of 14 in the 1991 Census of Population conducted by Statistics Canada.

See also 
List of communities in Alberta
List of former urban municipalities in Alberta
List of hamlets in Alberta

References 

Hamlets in Alberta
Former villages in Alberta
Special Area No. 2